Angelos Tsiris (born 18 August 2004) is a Greek professional footballer who plays as an midfielder for Super League club PAS Giannina.

References

2004 births
Living people
Greek footballers
Super League Greece players
PAS Giannina F.C. players
Association football midfielders
Souliotes
Footballers from Epirus (region)